Westfield Chermside, colloquially known as 'Chermside or Chermy', is a regional shopping centre located in the Brisbane northern suburb of Chermside. It is the second largest regional shopping centre in Australia by number of stores, behind Chadstone Shopping Centre, and is operated by Scentre Group. The centre contains the Chermside bus station, a major hub for buses north of Brisbane.

Westfield Chermside's trade area population is 439,600. It is one of the largest markets for shopping centres in Queensland and Australia. Its 15.5 million customer visits per annum make it Australia's second busiest Westfield shopping centre. The centre is located on the corner of Gympie Road and Hamilton Road.

Major retailers
Majors:
 Myer Department Store - three levels
 David Jones Department Store - two Levels
 Harris Scarfe Department Store  
 Big W Discount Department Store
 Kmart Discount Department Store
 Target Discount Department Store
 Coles Supermarket
 Woolworths Supermarket
 Event Cinemas 16-screen cinema complex with VMAX and Gold Class
 Uniqlo Clothing Store

Mini majors:
 Apple Store
 Best & Less
 JB Hi-Fi
 Rebel Sport

Chermside Centre has many cafés and speciality stores on its first and second levels, with restaurants spread across all four levels.

Opening

Allan and Stark's Chermside Drive-in Shopping Centre (Now Westfield Chermside) was opened on 31 May 1957 by the then Premier of Queensland Vince Gair.  The Brisbane Telegraph reported that more than 15,000 people visited the centre on the opening day - 20 police were on hand for crowd control. According to The Courier-Mail, the opening had "all the trappings of a Hollywood premiere - prominent personalities, brass bands, popping flashbulbs ... and crowds". 

The shopping complex cost £600,000 and was set on 28 acres (11.33ha). It was marketed as the first suburban-style, post-war shopping precinct in the Southern Hemisphere with a modern design.  Allan and Stark promised a shopping experience that would be "both fun and a thrill". Premier Gair said "Every suburb should have its own shopping centre," 

It initially contained an Allan & Stark department store, a Brisbane Cash & Carry (BCC) supermarket, 24 speciality stores  including a florist, a milk and doughnut bar, a fruit and vegetable shop, a newsagent, a butcher's shop, a beauty salon, an optometrist, and a chemist. The centre also had its own children's nursery. There was parking for 650 cars. Porters were available to carry purchased items to shoppers’ cars. The terminus of Tram route 72 to Enoggera via Brisbane CBD was located opposite the Centre.

History
The Brisbane Cash and Carry, along with 31 other 32 BCC stores in Queensland, was taken over by Woolworths in 1958 resulting in that  chain entering the Queensland grocery market.  The Myer Emporium Ltd purchased Allan & Stark in 1959 and the Chermside store was renamed immediately.  

In 1965, the centre was air-conditioned and a restaurant was constructed. 

In 1969, the tram line closed. 

The original building that housed Myer was raised and a larger three level replacement building was opened in June 1977. Several renovations were completed in 1985, 1986 and 1987 adding another 29 stores and an underground car park to the centre. A business mall was constructed in February 1992.

The Westfield Group purchased the property from Coles Myer Limited in December 1996. 

In 1999, work began on a major redevelopment of the centre which was to nearly double its floor space. The redevelopment resulted in most of the existing structure being demolished, save for the Myer store and some pieces of adjoining mall, to make way for the larger complex. Stage one opened on 9 August, 1999, which contained a Coles Supermarket and a new bus interchange. In 2000, the second stage of the redevelopment opened, containing a Kmart, Bi-Lo (which existed until March 2008), Target and a 900-seat food court. A new Birch Carroll & Coyle cinema complex also opened, which it was claimed resulted in  customers moving away from the cinemas at Westfield Toombul (Now Toombul Shopping Centre).

In 2005, construction began on another expansion, which officially opened on 19 October 2006 and contained 2,300 more car parks, and over 100 new specialty stores. In August 2007, the two level David Jones store was officially opened and is located in the same expansion. The following year saw the opening of another department store on the site of the former Bi-Lo supermarket, however smaller, which is the first Harris Scarfe store in Brisbane. In late 2009, an Apple Store opened in the centre.

In 2011, Westfield Chermside introduced a new 'Park Assist' system to help shoppers find available car parks quicker. At the same time the centre also introduced a pay parking scheme designed to stop commuters parking vehicles at the centre. Parking under three hours remains free and entry after 6 pm will be free as well.

The centre has been blamed for the downturn in trade in surrounding shopping centres, especially Toombul Shopping Centre. In the case of Toombul, the ex-Westfield centre's trade has been affected during the 21st century, David Jones, and many other stores have closed down at Toombul.

In 2015, Scentre Group announced the Westfield Chermside Redevelopment, which will add up to 95 new retailers, a gallery mall, new dining and entertainment precincts and major expansion to the second floor. Construction was started in January 2015 and the new area was opened to shoppers on 6 April 2017. The new development included international fast fashion stores like H&M (Closed 2022), Sephora and Zara (Closed 2021).

The Westfield Chermside Redevelopment, which was known as "The New Westfield Chermside" opened in early 2017. This expansion was addition of a second level of stores above the Myer to David Jones fashion mall, and introduced international brands including H&M, Sephora, Uniqlo and Zara. JB HiFi, Rebel & Optus also moved from their existing stores to new locations in the redevelopment.

On 22 June 2017, the final stage of the redevelopment was officially opened. This included a new restaurant precinct with more than 20 cafes and restaurants, creating Westfield's largest dining precinct.  In addition, an incubator store alley and a lifestyle precinct with new A bowling alley, laser tag, new Gymnasium and a child minding centre were opened.

See also

Scentre Group
Myer

References

External links
Westfield Chermside home page
Westfield Chermside Property Portfolio

Shopping centres in Brisbane
Shopping malls established in 1957
1957 establishments in Australia
Chermside